Blow Breeze is a 2016 South Korean weekend drama starring Son Ho-jun, Lim Ji-yeon, Han Joo-wan, Oh Ji-eun, Hwang Bo-ra and Jang Se-hyun. It is aired on MBC on Saturdays and Sundays at 20:40 for 50 episodes from August 27, 2016.

Plot
Mi-poong was a North Korean girl who studies dancing. She is bright and easygoing despite the situation in her country. One day, she has to defect to Seoul. She then meets Jang-go, an honest South Korean lawyer. Both of them get entangled in family inheritance problem.

Cast

Main characters
Lim Ji-yeon as Kim Mi-poong / Kim Seung-hee
Son Ho-jun as Lee Jang-go
 Yoon Chan-young as young Jang-go.
Han Joo-wan as Jo Hee-dong
Oh Ji-eun  as Park Shin Ae (Episode 1 to  12)
Im Soo-hyang as Park Shin Ae (Episode 13 to 53 )
Hwang Bo-ra as Jo Hee-ra

People around Jang-go
Kim Young-ok as Dal-rae
Geum Bo-ra as Hwang Geum-sil 
Kim Hee-jung as Lee Nam-yi
Lee Dae-yeon as Lee Kyung-shik
Han Hye-rin as Jang Ha-yeon
Kim Hyun as Soon-boon

People around Mi-poong
Lee Il-hwa as Joo Young-ae
Shin Cheol-jin as Mr.Yoo
Hong Dong-young as Kim Yoo-sung

Others 
 Ham Sung-min as Kim Deok-cheon	
 Son Woo-hyeon

Guests 
 Joo Suk-tae as Private investigator
 Kim Byeong-ok as Plastic surgeon (cameo)

Ratings
In the table below, the blue numbers represent the lowest ratings and the red numbers represent the highest ratings.

Original soundtrack

Part 1

Part 2

Part 3

Part 4

Part 5

Part 6

Part 7

Part 8

Part 9

Part 10

Part 11

Part 12

Part 13

Part 14

Part 15

Part 16

Part 17

Part 18

Part 19

Part 20

Part 21

Part 22

Part 23

Part 24

Part 25

Part 26

Awards and nominations

International broadcast

Notes

References

External links
  

MBC TV television dramas
2016 South Korean television series debuts
2017 South Korean television series endings
South Korean romance television series